Thomas Baptiste (17 March 1929 – 6 December 2018) was a Guyanese-born British actor and opera singer.

Biography
Baptiste was born in British Guiana (now Guyana) as the son of a wealthy landowner. He moved to Britain in the late 1940s. His one contact was the Labour MP Tom Driberg, who helped him gain factory employment, and Baptiste enrolled at Morley College in Lambeth to study music followed by scholarships to the National School of Opera and Royal Academy of Music. Baptiste joined Joan Littlewood's Theatre Workshop early in its existence.

Baptiste appeared in a production of Noël Coward's Nude with Violin for two years from 1956 with John Gielgud, Patience Collier and Kathleen Harrison, first in Dublin and then the West End. In 1960, he played Riley in the first professional production of Harold Pinter's  The Room and in a production directed by Pinter himself who had wanted to cast Baptiste in the role. It became an episode of ITV's Television Playhouse broadcast in October 1961. In 1963, Baptiste played the first Black character to appear in Coronation Street, a bus conductor who was falsely sacked as a result of a racist altercation with Len Fairclough. Fable (1965) was an episode of The Wednesday Play written by John Hopkins which imagined Britain as a mirror apartheid society with Barbara Assoon playing his wife as she had done in Coronation Street. Alun Owen's drama Pal (Play for Today, 1971), of which no recording survives, was the first British television play to feature a black gay character. Meanwhile on stage during the 1960s, he played Doolittle in Pygmalion and George in Who's Afraid of Virginia Woolf?. Later, he played Paul Robeson, who he admired greatly, in Are You Now or Have You Ever Been? at the Birmingham Rep in 1978, a production which transferred to Mayfair.

In the 1960s, he co-founded an advisory committee of the British Actors' Equity Association, to represent black actors in Britain. In an interview which appeared in 1992, Baptiste said that he thought black actors were having even more difficulty beginning their careers than he had done forty years earlier.

Selected credits

Stage
 Nude with Violin (as Obadiah Lewellyn)
 Who's Afraid of Virginia Woolf? (as George)
 Pygmalion (as Alfred Doolittle)
 Are You Now or Have You Ever Been? 1978 Birmingham Rep (as Paul Robeson)

Film
 Sapphire (1959) - Man on the Street (uncredited)
 Beyond This Place (1959) - Haydock
 Flame in the Streets (1961) - (uncredited)
 In the Cool of the Day (1963) - Murray Logan's chauffeur (uncredited)
 Guns at Batasi (1964) - Minor Role (uncredited)
 Dr. Terror's House of Horrors (1965) - Dambala (segment "Voodoo") (uncredited)
 The Ipcress File (1965) - Barney - American Agent
 Help! (1965) - Bandsman (uncredited)
 Jemima & Johnny (1966, Short) - Jemima's Father
 The Comedians (1967) - Haitian Soldier (uncredited)
 The Seven Red Berets (1969) - African soldier (uncredited)
 Two Gentlemen Sharing (1969) - Mutt, Moving Man
 Sunday Bloody Sunday (1971) - Prof. Johns
 Divorce His, Divorce Hers (1973, TV Movie) - Minister
 Black Snake (1973) - Isiah
 Shaft in Africa (1973) - Kopo
 Ghost in the Noonday Sun (1973) - Andullah
 Honeybaby, Honeybaby (1974) - Gen. Christian Awani
 The Wild Geese (1978) - Col. Mboya
 The Class of Miss MacMichael (1978) - Visitor
 The Music Machine (1979) - Claire's Father
 The Dogs of War (1980) - Dexter
 Rise and Fall of Idi Amin (1981) - Dr. Michael Oloya
 Ama (1991) - Babs
 The Secret Laughter of Women (1999) - Papa Fola

Television
 Nightfall at Kriekville (1961) - Bantu Parson
 Coronation Street (1963) - Johnny Alexander
 Fable (The Wednesday Play, 1965) - Mark
 Till Death Us Do Part (intolerance) 1966
 Pal (1971)
 Empire Road (1978-1979) - Herbie
 Yes Minister (The Official Visit, 1980) - President Selim Mohammed (formerly Charlie Umtali before conversion to Islam)
 Minder (high drains pilferer) (1984) - Mr. Mikabwe
 King (1984) - Mr. King
 Drums Along Balmoral Drive (1986) - Badinga
 EastEnders (1990)
 Love Hurts (1992) - Lord Godfrey

References

External links
 

1929 births
2018 deaths
British male stage actors
British male film actors
British male television actors
Guyanese emigrants to England
20th-century British male actors